The 2023–24 season is the 144th season of competitive football by Rangers.

Players

Squad information

Transfers

In

First team

Academy

Out

First team

Academy

New contracts

First team

Academy

Awards

Pre-season and friendlies

Competitions

Overall

Scottish Premiership

League table

Results by round

Matches

Scottish Cup

Scottish League Cup

Footnotes

References

Rangers F.C. seasons
Rangers